The 1959–60 Hovedserien was the 16th completed season of top division football in Norway.

Overview
It was contested by 16 teams, and Fredrikstad won the championship, their eighth league title. This was the first season a bronze medal was awarded.

Teams and locations
Note: Table lists in alphabetical order.

League tables

Group A

Group B

Results

Group A

Group B

Championship final
Fredrikstad 6–2 Lillestrøm

Bronze final
Eik 4–2 Vålerengen

References
Norway - List of final tables (RSSSF)

Eliteserien seasons
Norway
1959 in Norwegian football
1960 in Norwegian football